Fachinal Airport (is an airstrip  west of Chile Chico in the Aysén Region of Chile.

There is mountainous terrain in all quadrants.  Approach and departure to either end of the runway are over the lake. The runway has an additional  of unpaved overrun on the west end.

See also

Transport in Chile
List of airports in Chile

References

External links
OpenStreetMap - Fachinal
OurAirports - Fachinal
SkyVector - Chile Chico/Fachinal
FallingRain - Fachinal Airport

Airports in Aysén Region